Richard Gilbert may refer to:

 Richard Gilbert (professor), professor of economics
 Richard Gilbert (printer) (1794–1852), English printer and compiler of reference works
 Richard Gilbert (cricketer) (born 1980), English cricketer
 Richard fitz Gilbert (1030–1091), Norman lord
 Rick Gilbert (born 1943), American diver
 Dick Gilbert (rugby union), English rugby union player

See also
 Dick Gilbert, American actor